A white lie is a minor lie which could be considered harmless, or even beneficial, in the long term.

White lie may also refer to:

 White Lie (film), a Canadian drama film
 White Lie (TV series), a South Korean television series

See also
 White Lies (disambiguation)
 Little White Lies (disambiguation)